John Hargrave (1894–1982) was a British youth leader and politician.

John Hargrave may also refer to:

John Hargrave (architect) (c. 1788–1833), Irish architect
John Hargrave (judge) (1815–1885), Australian politician
For the Internet humorist who styles himself as "Sir" John Hargrave, see Zug.com

See also
John Hargreaves (disambiguation)
John Hargrove (disambiguation)